Silkstone is a civil parish in the metropolitan borough of Barnsley, South Yorkshire, England.  The parish contains 23 listed buildings that are recorded in the National Heritage List for England.  Of these, one is listed at Grade I, the highest of the three grades, one is at Grade II*, the middle grade, and the others are at Grade II, the lowest grade.  The parish contains the villages of Silkstone and Silkstone Common, and the surrounding countryside.  The most important building in the parish is All Saints Church, which is listed, together with graveslabs, a tomb, and a memorial in the churchyard.  The other listed buildings are houses and cottages, farmhouses and farm buildings, a war memorial, and a set of stocks.


Key

Buildings

References

Citations

Sources

z

 

Lists of listed buildings in South Yorkshire
Buildings and structures in the Metropolitan Borough of Barnsley